Suzon Fuks (born 1959) is an intermedia artist, choreographer and director exploring the integration and interaction of dance and moving image through performance, screen, installation and online work. She is the founder of the Waterwheel interactive performance platform.

Biography
Born in 1959 in Belgium, but currently (as of 2012) based in Australia, Fuks trained in dance, theatre and music at the Lillian Lambert Academy, Brussels (69-76), she completed her Masters in Visual Arts at La Cambre (79-84). She has been directing for both stage and screen since 1985, directing 15 movement-based intermedia performances, created film/video-scenography/installation for 21 productions, directed and edited 26 films and videos including 16 screen-dances and co-devised 15 online performance interactive works. She received a Green Room Award for Video-Scenography in Theatre (New Form). Her screendance 'fragmentation' was nominated for a ReelDance award in 2007 and also nominated for an Australian Dance on film award] which screened on all continents.

Fuks gives lectures, workshops, master classes and labs in Australia, US, and Europe on the integration of visual media and the performing arts, fostering intermedia artistic collaboration and is currently a Copeland Fellow at Amherst College Mentored in 03 by Keith Armstrong and Kelli Dipple  and Mike Stubbs on networked performance under an Australian council national media arts grant. She continued her research in that field developing and performing in the 07-10 Upstage Festivals, Backyard Dances for Electromog festival; Live, media and performance lab and participated in 10  at EMPAC, New York. at EMP. She is a founding member of cyberformance group ActiveLayers (UK, NZ, Aus).

Igneous state that there interest lie in process, interaction, diversity and challenging values and with international residences which allows them to collaborate more freely with artist from many different areas of study. These included Brisbane Powerhouse, Department of performance studies at The University of Sydney, Australian choreographic Centre] in Canberra, Dance4 Nottingham University of Brighton and as far Kochi (India) where they worked with Asialink.

In 2011 Fuks established Waterwheel, a project which describes itself as "an interactive, collaborative platform for sharing media and ideas, performance and presentation" which "provides a platform and forum for experience and exchange, expression and experimentation". This project was initiated by Fuks as part of an Arts Council Fellowship assisted by the Australian Government; in collaboration with IGNEOUS and INKAHOOTS and supported by the Queensland Government through Arts Queensland, Brisbane City Council, the Judith Wright Center for performing arts], Ausdance Queensland, and iMAL. Speaking about her interest in the theme of water in an interview in 2011, Fuks says, "I became more interested in the politics of water. I started questioning how in developed countries we have access to things and information and take so much for granted. Water is becoming a commodity. I observed that most water infrastructures are made by men, but in developing countries the collection and handling of water is usually a matter for women" 
She was a Creative Sparks grant recipient in 2011, a joint initiative of Brisbane City Council and the Queensland Government through Arts Queensland.
In March 2008 she formed ActiveLayers along with Liz Bryce, James Cunningham and Cherry Truluck.

References

External links
  Waterwheel

1959 births
Living people
Belgian choreographers
20th-century Belgian women artists
21st-century Belgian women artists